Adrenergic urticaria is a skin condition characterized by an eruption consisting of small (1-5mm) red macules and papules with a pale halo, appearing within 10 to 15 min after emotional upset.  There have been 10 cases described in medical literature, and involve a trigger (coffee, intense emotions) followed by a rise in catechomines and IgE.  Treatment involves propranolol and trigger avoidance.

See also 
 Aquagenic urticaria
 Urticaria
 Skin lesion
 List of cutaneous conditions

References

Urticaria and angioedema